Stir, STIR, stirred, or stirrer may refer to:

Art and entertainment
 Stir (band), a music group from 1994-2005
 Stir (1980 film), a 1980 Australian film directed by Stephen Wallace
 Stir (1997 film), a 1997 American film starring Tony Todd
 Stir (TV series)
 "Stirred", a West Wing episode

Business
 STIR future (short-term interest rate), in stocks

Technology
 Short tau inversion recovery (STIR), a magnetic resonance imaging (MRI) sequence
 SHAKEN/STIR, Secure Telephone Identity Revisited (STIR) standards
 Stirrer, an agitator (device)
 Stirring rod
 STIR (radar), a type of fire control radar

See also 
 
 
 Stire, a cider apple variety
 Stires, a surname
 Shaken, not stirred (disambiguation)
 Mix (disambiguation)